Huttonaea is a genus of flowering plants from the orchid family, Orchidaceae. It contains 5 known species, all native to southern Africa (South Africa and Lesotho). This genus was named in honour of Caroline Hutton née Atherstone.

Huttonaea fimbriata (Harv.) Rchb.f.
Huttonaea grandiflora (Schltr.) Rolfe in W.H.Harvey 
Huttonaea oreophila Schltr.
Huttonaea pulchra Harv.
Huttonaea woodii Schltr.

References

 Pridgeon, A.M., Cribb, P.J., Chase, M.A. & Rasmussen, F. eds. (1999). Genera Orchidacearum 1. Oxford Univ. Press.
 Pridgeon, A.M., Cribb, P.J., Chase, M.A. & Rasmussen, F. eds. (2001). Genera Orchidacearum 2. Oxford Univ. Press.
 Pridgeon, A.M., Cribb, P.J., Chase, M.A. & Rasmussen, F. eds. (2003). Genera Orchidacearum 3. Oxford Univ. Press
 Berg Pana, H. 2005. Handbuch der Orchideen-Namen. Dictionary of Orchid Names. Dizionario dei nomi delle orchidee. Ulmer, Stuttgart

External links

Orchids of Africa
Orchideae
Orchideae genera